The Boeing Model 42 (also Boeing XCO-7 for Experimental Corps Observation Model 7) was an American biplane aircraft developed from the Airco DH.4, taking advantage of the large number of aircraft left over after the end of World War I.

Development and design
The Model 42 was essentially an Airco DH-4M-1 fitted with new Boeing tailplanes, tapered wings, and tripod landing gear. The first aircraft built, designated XCO-7, was used as a static test bed, and did not fly. The second aircraft, XCO-7A, used a standard DH-4M-1 fuselage and Liberty engine, with the Boeing modifications. The final aircraft, XCO-7B, added balanced elevators and inverted the Liberty engine. Both flyable aircraft were shipped to McCook Field, where the first flight occurred on 6 February 1925.

The performance of the new aircraft did not justify the cost of the conversion, and Boeing abandoned the project.

Specifications (XCO-7A)

References

 Bowers, Peter M. Boeing aircraft since 1916. London: Putnam Aeronautical Books, 1966.

1920s United States military reconnaissance aircraft
042
Biplanes
Single-engined tractor aircraft
Aircraft first flown in 1925